Mets–Willets Point (formerly Shea Stadium) is a station on the Long Island Rail Road's Port Washington Branch in Flushing Meadows–Corona Park, Queens, New York City.

Prior to 2021, the station would normally be open only during New York Mets home games at Citi Field (Shea Stadium prior to 2009), the U.S. Open tennis tournament at the USTA National Tennis Center, major events such as concerts, and during emergencies. In February 2021, the station began to be open full time and was served by all trains while Citi Field was being used as a COVID-19 vaccination site. Although the vaccination site is now closed, the station remains open at all times and continues to be served by all Port Washington Branch trains indefinitely. Although Mets–Willets Point was originally not part of CityTicket, it was added to the CityTicket program in August 2011, and fares are collected before boarding during games and special events. 

The proposed AirTrain LaGuardia service to LaGuardia Airport would connect with the LIRR at the Willets Point station.

As of February 27, 2023 trains will no longer serve the station full time following the 2023 opening of Grand Central Madison and the timetable changes to accommodate the new Grand Central Madison.

History
The station, which opened in time for the 1939 New York World's Fair, included a modernistic structure above the tracks that could accommodate up to 18,000 passengers per hour. Resembling an airplane hangar, it combined both Art Deco and Bauhaus features, and was also in close proximity to the Railroads on Parade exhibit.

Between 1946 and 1952, the station was known as United Nations Station. Flushing Meadows-Corona Park was the temporary site of the U.N. General Assembly, and had shuttle buses to their temporary headquarters in Lake Success at the time. Once the UN moved to its permanent home on the east side of Midtown-Manhattan, the station closed. However, it was reopened again with its original name on January 11, 1961, and the 1939 World's Fair ramp was expanded for the 1964 New York World's Fair to connect the Flushing Meadows–Corona Park to Shea Stadium, which opened that same year (though it was not part of the World's Fair). After the World's Fair closed in 1965, the station was named for Shea Stadium in 1966.

When the Elmhurst station closed in 1985, Shea Stadium station became the westernmost station on the Port Washington Branch before merging with the LIRR Main Line at Winfield Junction. As of 2003, a portion of track from the Whitestone Branch, which diverged just east of the station, was still visible next to the westbound track.

Following the 2009 closure and demolition of Shea Stadium, the Metropolitan Transportation Authority renamed the station to Mets–Willets Point, matching the name of the adjoining subway station and omitting the corporate-sponsored name, Citi Field, associated with the current stadium. The MTA was unsuccessful in achieving a similar naming rights deal and would not post the name for free. Had the naming rights deal been achieved, the station would have been known as Citi Field.

Planned renovation and accessibility
In September 2014, the MTA announced renovation plans for the Mets–Willets Point LIRR station, which would see its current active platform (see below) extend in length from eight cars to 12 cars, including the installation of an elevator, which would connect to the New York City Parks Department passarelle, leading to Flushing Meadows–Corona Park, making the station fully ADA accessible. The project was scheduled to be completed in time for the 2016 baseball season, but , the elevator has not been installed.

Station layout
The Port Washington Branch has six tracks at this station. This station has three high-level island platforms. The north platform, adjacent to Tracks 1 and 2, the two main tracks, is eight cars long. The center platform, adjacent to Tracks 3 and 4, is also eight cars long. The south platform, adjacent to Tracks 5 and 6, is six cars long. Only the north platform is currently in use; the other tracks have not been used in regular passenger service since the 1964-65 World's Fair. The stairwells leading to the other platforms are blocked off, the platforms are in disrepair, and the tracks are rusted over. The platforms are decorated in the Mets team colors, blue and orange. East and west of the station, the six tracks merge into two tracks.

References

External links

 2019 LIRR service for Mets-Willets Point station (overview)
SHEA Interlocking (The LIRR Today)
Mets-Willets Point (The LIRR Today)
Long Island Rail Road; New York World's Fair 1939-40 and 1964-65 (TrainsAreFun)
Before Shea Stadium (Arrt's Arrchives.com)
1939–40 World's Fair Station including Railroads on Parade
United Nations Station and 1964–65 World's Fair Station
 Platforms from Google Maps Street View

Flushing Meadows–Corona Park
Long Island Rail Road stations in New York City
Railway stations in Queens, New York
Railway stations in the United States opened in 1939
Port Authority of New York and New Jersey AirTrain
1939 establishments in New York City